Andreas Latzko (1 September 1876, in Budapest, Hungary – 11 September 1943, in Amsterdam, Netherlands) was an Austro-Hungarian pacifist of Jewish origin, a novelist and biographer.

Early life
Andreas Latzko attended grammar school and high school in Budapest. After high school, he served in the Imperial and Royal Austria-Hungarian army as a one-year volunteer and was a reserve officer of the Ersatzheer. He then went to Berlin, where he first studied chemistry and then philosophy at the University of Berlin.

Career beginnings
Latzko wrote his first literary works in Hungarian. His first in German, a one-act play, was published in Berlin. He also worked as a journalist, traveling to Egypt, India, Ceylon and Java.

World War I and its aftermath
In August 1914, at the beginning of World War I, he returned to Egypt and served as an officer in the Imperial and Royal Wehrmacht of Austria-Hungary. With the beginning of the war between Italy and Austria-Hungary, he was sent to the front on the Isonzo River. He fell ill with malaria, but he was not sent away from the front until he suffered a severe shock from a heavy Italian artillery attack near Gorizia.

After eight months in the hospital, he moved at the end of 1916 to the Swiss resort town of Davos for further recuperation and rehabilitation. While there he wrote six chapters of his book Men in War, which deals with the Great War at the River Isonzo front. In 1917, the book was published anonymously in Zurich by Rascher-Verlag. Karl Kraus wrote in his magazine Die Fackel, "This book is a scream and a relevant document about the Great War and humanity. Some people know the day is not so far off when the officials of Austria will be proud to be involved into the war by that book." The book was a great success and translated into 19 languages. However, every country involved in the war banned it, and the army supreme command demoted Latzko.

In 1918 the book was printed again in an edition of 33,000 copies. It was widely praised, with one critic describing the novel's theme of "disillusionment and an almost morbid sympathy with mental and physical suffering" as well as "a prevailing nihilistic tone". The New York Times said it was "a bitter attack upon the by-products of the Teutonic military idea."

While in Switzerland, Latzko met Romain Rolland and Stefan Zweig.

Latzko wrote and published two more novels in 1918: The Judgement of Peace, about the lives of German soldiers on the Western Front, and The Wild Man. That same year, he wrote the text Women in War for the International Women’s Conference in Bern.

Life in Germany
With the end of the war in 1918, Latzko moved to Munich and followed the Bavarian republic of Gustav Landauer. He was expelled from Bavaria and moved to Salzburg, where he met Georg Friedrich Nicolai during the latter's visit to Stefan Zweig. Nicolai had published a book in 1917, The Biology of War, that Latzko admired. In Salzburg, Latzko worked as a journalist and wrote articles for several newspapers.

Later career and death
In 1929, his novel Seven Days was published. He moved to Amsterdam in 1931. In 1933, the Hitler regime ordered his books burned. He lived in Amsterdam at Cliostraat. He died there in 1943. He is buried at Zorgvlied, in the same grave as his wife who died in 1965. In 1948, a monument was placed upon his grave, designed by sculptor Jan Havermans. His grave at the Zorgvlied cemetery in Amsterdam is due to be abandoned in October 2021.

Literary works 
 Hans im Glück, play (comedy). Date of publication unknown.
 Der Roman der Herrn Cordé, novel. Date of publication unknown.
 Apostel, play (comedy). Date of publication unknown.
 Menschen im Krieg (1918, translated as Men in War), novel. Rascher-Verlag, Zürich 1917.
 Friedensgericht (1918, translated as The Judgement of Peace), novel. Rascher-Verlag, Zürich 1918.
 Der wilde Mann (The Wild Man), novel. Rascher-Verlag Zürich 1918.
 Frauen im Krieg (Women in War), essay. Rascher-verlag Zürich 1918.
 Sieben Tage (Seven Days), novel. 1931.
 Marcia Reale. Malik-Verlag, Berlin 1932.
 Lafayette (1935), English translation by E. W. Dickes Lafayette: A Soldier of Liberty, Methuen, London, 1936.

References 
 Karl Kraus Die Fackel Nr.462/S.175, Vienna 1917.
 Karl Kraus Die Fackel Nr.857/S.118, Vienna 1931.
 Wieland Herzfelde Thirty new novelists from the New Germany, Berlin 1932.
 Franz Ögg Registry of persons in 'Die Fackel''', Munich 1968–1976.
 Herbert Gantschacher Viktor Ullmann – Zeuge und Opfer der Apokalypse / Witness and Victim of the Apocalypse / Testimone e vittima dell’Apocalisse / Svědek a oběť apokalypsy / Prič in žrtev apokalipse. ARBOS-Edition, Arnoldstein / Klagenfurt / Salzburg / Wien / Prora / Prag 2015, p. 6-48 and p. 193-195.
 Frank Krause: Family Virtues and Social Critique: Andreas Latzko’s Anti-War Prose (1917-1918). In: Ritchie Robertson and Andreas Kramer (eds): Pacifist and Anti-Militarist Writing in German, 1892-1928: From Bertha von Suttner to Erich Maria Remarque.'' Munich: iudicium, 2018, pp. 160-171.

Notes

External links 
 
 
 
 
 Herbert Gantschacher: The Limits of Virtual Reality or Our deal with the past and future
 Collectie Andreas Latzkos Werke in der "Bibliotheek van de Universiteit van Amsterdam"

1876 births
1943 deaths
Jewish Austrian writers
Austro-Hungarian writers
20th-century Austrian novelists
20th-century Hungarian novelists
Hungarian male novelists
Jewish philanthropists
Austrian philanthropists
Hungarian philanthropists
Austro-Hungarian Jews
Writers from Budapest
20th-century Austrian male writers
20th-century Hungarian male writers
Austro-Hungarian military personnel of World War I